Two Worlds Collide is the third studio album by Australian country band The McClymonts, released in Australia on 18 May 2012 by Universal Records. It won at the 2012 ARIA Music Awards for Best Country Album.

Critical reception
The first single from Two Worlds Collide, went to number one on the Australian Country Music chart and the CMC Video Chart in the first week of April 2012. The song is based on a relationship of songwriter Andrew Dorff.

Track listing
 "Two Worlds Collide"
 "The Easy Part"
 "Everybody's Looking to Fall in Love"
 "Piece of Me"
 "Sweet"
 "Where You Are"
 "Little Old Beat Up Heart"
 "Those Summer Days"
 "How Long Have You Known"
 "This Ain't Over"
 "Feel Like Going Home"

Charts

Weekly charts

Year-end charts

References

2012 albums
ARIA Award-winning albums
The McClymonts albums
Universal Records albums